Oslobođenje ('Liberation') is a daily newspaper in Bosnia and Herzegovina based in the capital city Sarajevo. Founded on 30 August 1943, in the midst of World War II, on a patch of territory liberated by Partisans, in what was otherwise a German-occupied country, the paper gained recognition over the years for its high journalistic standards and is recipient of numerous domestic honors and international awards in a branch.

History and profile

Oslobođenje was founded on 30 August 1943 in Donja Trnova near Ugljevik, as an anti-Nazi newspaper. During the Bosnian war and the Siege of Sarajevo, the Oslobođenje staff operated out of a makeshift newsroom in a bomb shelter after its 10-story office building had been destroyed. The war left five staff members dead and 25 wounded.

In 1993, it was awarded the Sakharov Prize for Freedom of Thought. The editors of Oslobođenje, Kemal Kurspahić and Gordana Knežević, were named International Editors of the Year for 1993 by the World Press Review in New York, for their "bravery, tenacity, and dedication to the principles of journalism." Duo also received the Courage in Journalism Award in 1992 from the International Women's Media Foundation in Washington, D.C.. Kurspahić was also recipient of the Nieman Fellowship for Journalism at Harvard University in 1994, among other honors. Immediately after the war ended in 1995, editor-in-chief Mehmed Halilović accepted the University of Missouri [Mizzou] Honor Medal from the School of Journalism in Columbia, Missouri for continuous publication of the daily newspaper throughout the 1992–95 siege of Sarajevo. During the war, its staff, consisting of Bosniaks, Bosnian Serbs, and Bosnian Croats, managed to print the paper every day, with one exception.

In 2006, the company was bought by way of the Sarajevo Stock Exchange by two leading city industries: the Sarajevo Tobacco Factory and the Sarajevska pivara.

The paper is close to the Social Democratic Party of Bosnia and Herzegovina.

Awards and recognition
 The Paper of the Year in 1989 (Socialist Federal Republic of Yugoslavia)
 The Paper of the Year Award in 1992 (BBC and Granada TV – Great Britain)
 Freedom Award in 1993 (Dagens nyheter, Stockholm; and Politiken Copenhagen)
 Oscar Romero Award 1993 (The Rothko Chapel – Houston, Texas)
 Nieman Foundation's Louis M. Lyons Award for conscience and integrity in journalism in 1993 (Harvard University – USA)
 Achievements in Journalism Award in 1993 (Inter Press Service, Rome – previously the International Journalism Award)
 University of Missouri Honor Medal in 1995 by the School of Journalism for continuous publication of the daily newspaper throughout the 1992–1995 siege of Sarajevo.
 Andrei Sakharov Award for Human Rights 1993 (European Parliament – Strasbourg, France)

Associated journalists 

 Jelena Silajdžić, human rights activist

References

External links

 

Newspapers published in Sarajevo
Newspapers published in Yugoslavia
Newspapers established in 1943
Sakharov Prize laureates
1943 establishments in Bosnia and Herzegovina